Icehouse: The Martian Chess Set is a 1999 board game published by Looney Labs.

Gameplay
Icehouse, The Martian Chess Set is a set of playing pieces used for a number of abstract strategy games.

Reception
The reviewer from the online second volume of Pyramid stated that "Each of these games capitalizes on the unique nature of the Icehouse playing pieces to create unique and clever board games."

Icehouse: The Martian Chess Set won the Origins Awards in the category "Best Abstract Board Game 2000".

References

Icehouse games
Origins Award winners